South Dakota Highway 158 (SD 158) is a  state highway in Vernon Township, Grant County, South Dakota, United States. It travels from an intersection with SD 15 and SD 20 to the Minnesota state line, where it continues as Lac qui Parle County State-Aid Highway 44 (CSAH 44).

Route description
SD 158 begins at an intersection with SD 15 and SD 20 north of La Bolt and treks east through flat farmland.

SD 158 is maintained by SDDOT. In 2012, the traffic on the highway was measured in average annual daily traffic, and SD 158 had an average of 235 vehicles. The designation is not a part of the National Highway System, a system of highways important to the nation's defense, economy, and mobility.

Major intersections

See also

 List of state highways in South Dakota

References

External links

 The Unofficial South Dakota Highways Page

158
Transportation in Grant County, South Dakota